Himeroconcha lamlanensis is a species of gastropod in the family Charopidae that is endemic to Guam.

References

Fauna of Guam
Himeroconcha
Gastropods described in 1982
Taxonomy articles created by Polbot